The Shrewsbury River is a short stream and navigable estuary. The stream is approximately 8 mi (13 km) long and is located in Central New Jersey.

It extends east-northeast from its head of navigation at Oceanport to its confluence with the Navesink River estuary, then entering 1 mi (1.6 km) north in a narrow channel to Sandy Hook Bay at Highlands.  The south shore runs about the entire length of the northern border of Long Branch.  The estuary is protected from the open Atlantic Ocean on its eastern side by a long barrier peninsula that extends north to become Sandy Hook. Jersey Shore resort communities on the peninsula include Monmouth Beach and Sea Bright. On the inner side of the estuary, the bedroom community of Rumson on the end of the peninsula, separating the Shrewsbury and Navesink estuaries, is among the wealthiest communities in the United States.

The estuary provides a popular marina for pleasure craft and recreational fishing. Marine species like Fluke (summer flounder), striped bass, bluefish and weakfish are popular fish targeted by local anglers.

Tributaries

 Navesink River
 Pleasure Bay

Bridges
 Capt. Joseph Azzolina Memorial Bridge
 Bascule Bridge
 Gooseneck Point Bridge

Marinas
 Anglers Marina
 Bakers Landing Marina
 Channel Club Marina
 Gateway Marina
 Long Branch Ice Boat & Yacht Club
 Oceanport Landing
 Navesink Marina 
 Patten Point Yacht Club
 Pleasure Bay Yacht Basin

See also
 List of New Jersey rivers
 Navesink River
 Raritan River
 Raritan Bay
 Lower New York Bay

External links
 U.S. Geological Survey: NJ stream gaging stations
 Nautical chart of the Shrewsbury River

Rivers of New Jersey
Rivers of Monmouth County, New Jersey